The title of Duke of Gramont (duc de Gramont) is a French dukedom and former peerage. It was created in 1648 for French Marshal Antoine III de Gramont.

History
The family of Gramont was a Navarrese medieval noble house and owned the chateau of Bidache. They held land in Lower Navarre and in neighbouring Gascony, part of the kingdom of France. As their liege lords, the kings of Navarre, they played an active role in French politics. The last heiress of the house, Claire de Gramont (died in 1534) wed Menaut d'Aure and their son Antoine took the name Gramont rather than d'Aure.

Antoine de Gramont was a leading noblemen in south-west France during the Wars of Religion. At first, a Calvinist and lieutenant general to Queen Jeanne d'Albret, he switched sides to Catholicism and King Charles IX's service. He was created Count of Guiche in 1563. Antoine de Gramont was also the first Gramont to claim sovereignty over the Principality of Bidache. His grandson, also named Antoine de Gramont, viceroy of Navarra, was created Duke of Gramont in 1643.

Another famous member of the ducal house was Philibert de Gramont (1621–1707), younger son of the first Duke.

Counts of Guiche
 1563-1576 : Antoine I de Gramont (1526-1576)
 1576-1580 : Philibert de Gramont (1552-1580)
 1580-1643 : Antoine II de Gramont (1572-1644)

Duke of Gramont, 1st Creation
 1643-1644 : Antoine II de Gramont (1572–1644). The patent for the creation of the title was not registered in Parliament before his death, so his son had to petition for a new creation.

Dukes of Gramont, 2nd Creation
 1648-1678 : Antoine III de Gramont-Touloujon, 2nd Duke of Gramont (1604–1678)
 1678-1720 : Antoine Charles IV de Gramont, 3rd Duke of Gramont (1641–1720)
 1720-1725 : Antoine V de Gramont, 4th Duke of Gramont (1671–1725)
 1725-1741 : Antoine VI Louis Armand de Gramont, 5th Duke of Gramont (1688–1741)
 1741-1745 : Louis I de Gramont, 6th Duke of Gramont (1689–1745)
 1745-1790 : Antoine VII de Gramont, 7th Duke of Gramont (1722–1801)
 1815-1836 : Antoine Louis Marie de Gramont, 8th Duke of Gramont (1755–1836)
 1836-1848 ; 1852-1855 : Antoine IX Geneviève Héraclius Agénor de Gramont, 9th Duke of Gramont (1789–1855)
 1855-1880 : Antoine Alfred Agénor de Gramont, 10th Duke of Gramont (1819–1880)
 1880-1925 : Antoine Alfred Agénor de Gramont, 11th Duke of Gramont (1851–1925)
 1925-1962 : Antoine Agénor Armand de Gramont, 12th Duke of Gramont (1879–1962)
 1962-1995 : Antoine Agénor Henri Armand de Gramont, 13th Duke of Gramont (1907–1995)
 1995-2014 : Antoine Armand Odélric Marie Henri de Gramont, 14th Duke of Gramont (1951–2014)
 2014- : Antoine de Gramont, 15th Duke of Gramont (b. 2008)

Gallery

See also
Gramont
Rothschild family

References

External links

Duché de Gramont
"casa de Gramont", Historia Medieval del Rayno de Navarra

 
Gramont
Gramont